Vered ( wéreḏ) is a Hebrew feminine given name, which means "rose." The name may refer to:

People

First name
Vered Benhorin (born 1974), American/Israeli Musician
Vered Benami (born 1986), American singer/songwriter
Vered Borochovski (born 1984), Israeli swimmer 
Vered Buskila (born 1983), Israeli sailor
Vered Tochterman (born 1970), Israeli writer

Surname
Idan Vered (born 1989), Israeli football player
Ilana Vered (born 1943), Israeli pianist
Jerome Vered (born 1958), American writer and game show contestant
Omer Vered (born 1990), Israeli football player
Ora Vered, Israeli beauty queen

Places
Ein Vered, Israel
Vered Hagalil, Israel
Vered Yeriho, Israel

See also
Rose (given name)
Shoshana

Hebrew words and phrases
Hebrew feminine given names
Hebrew-language surnames